Mehmet Hakkı Hocaoğlu  (born 1 February 1975 in Hatay) is a retired Turkish football player and manager.

He previously played for Sivasspor in the Süper Lig.

References

External links
Hakkı Hocaoğlu coaching profile at TFF
Hakkı Hocaoğlu player profile at TFF

1975 births
Living people
Turkish footballers
Samsunspor footballers
Kayseri Erciyesspor footballers
Sivasspor footballers
Kocaelispor footballers
Adanaspor footballers
Giresunspor footballers
Hatayspor footballers
Süper Lig players
TFF First League players
People from Antakya
Turkish football managers

Association football defenders
Sportspeople from Hatay